Admiral is a top military rank in the Ukrainian Navy. It is equivalent to the Colonel General rank in the Ground Forces of Ukraine.

There are three admiral ranks in the Ukrainian Navy and other two include Vice Admiral and Counter Admiral. There are only six admirals in Ukraine since 1992.

Admirals of Ukraine
 Mykhailo Yezhel (2000)
 Ihor Tenyukh (2008)
 Viktor Maksymov (2010)
 Ihor Kabanenko (2012)
 Yuriy Ilyin (2013)
 Ihor Alferiev (2013)

Past Admirals
  (1918)

See also
 Military ranks of Ukraine

References